Mick the Miller (29 June 1926 – 6 May 1939) was a male brindle greyhound. He is celebrated as the first great racing greyhound to compete in England (although he was born in Ireland). Despite a short three-year racing career, his achievements were highly publicised around the world and by the end of his career he had become an icon in the sport. His achievements include winning nineteen races in a row, including the English Greyhound Derby on two successive occasions. He suffered an injury at Wimbledon Stadium whilst racing which broke the streak in 1931, and once recovered was beaten in the attempt to win a third Derby title. He went on to appear in films, and is still considered one of the greatest sporting heroes in the UK.

Early life
Mick, a male brindle Greyhound, was born in Killeigh, County Offaly, Ireland before the introduction of Greyhound track racing in Ireland, and before the sport became popular in Britain. The smallest of a litter of ten puppies, his father was a direct descendant of Master McGrath, a famous Irish Greyhound who won the Waterloo Cup on three occasions. Originally expected to be used for hare coursing, a deal was discussed with dog owner Moses Rebenschied to take Mick to America to compete in the Greyhound racing circuit. However, before the deal could go through a tornado struck St. Louis, Missouri, killing 27 of Rebenschied's Greyhounds when the roof was blown off their kennel, and a further four dogs died when a van driven by his son was overturned by the storm. In a letter from Rebenschied calling off the deal he stated his reason, "I repeat, the hand of God is warning me against greyhounds."

A Catholic priest, Father Martin Brophy, brought Mick to race in England, although nearly sold the dog as a puppy to another priest, Father Maurice Browne. Although the Catholic Church in Ireland had no issues with Greyhound racing, the Catholic Church in Great Britain at the time was against it, having published a pamphlet entitled Dog Racing which called it a "threat to Sunday dinners", and described gambling that "the distribution of losses and dividends had an anti-social character because the poorest, the most unhappy, the physically and emotionally handicapped, are made to pay for the professionals and semi-professionals who get hold of intimate knowledge."

Racing career

1928
He made his debut at Shelbourne Park on 18 April 1928 winning the Punchestown Stakes. He raced five times during 1928, winning four times and equalled the 500 metres world record after recording 28.80 at Shelbourne. The day after competing in the Abercorn Cup final he suffered a serious illness and was diagnosed with distemper. He nearly died but was nursed back to health by the Shelbourne Park veterinary surgeon Arthur 'Doc' Callanan.

1929
He reached the Easter Cup final at Shelbourne and won the Spring Cup final at Harold's Cross Stadium and National Cup final at Shelbourne before travelling to England for the first time. In a solo trial prior to the 1929 English Greyhound Derby on 25 July, Mick broke the track record, reducing his odds from an initial 25–1 to becoming the 4–7 favorite to win by the time of the final, despite still being new off the board from Ireland. He was housed at the kennels of Paddy McEllistrim for the duration of the Derby. In the first round, Mick pulled away down the back straight, beating Captured Half by eight lengths and setting a time of 29.82, a new world record over that length. Father Browne sold Mick for £800, plus any prize money that the dog would win on the night, which at the time was more than the cost of buying a house in nearby Shepherd's Bush. By 8:45pm, when the final took place, some 40,000 spectators were in the ground. The lineup was four dogs; in trap one was Beadsman at 20–1; trap two was Palatinus at 3–1; trap three was Entomb at 9–2, and finally Mick the Miller in trap four, wearing the black jacket. Palatinus made the best start, at the first bend both Mick and Entomb attempted to move inside to the rail, but Beadsman collided with both of them, sending all three dogs sprawling. The no–race klaxon went off, and the race had to be restarted. None of the dogs was allowed to leave the track with until the race was re–run at 9:15pm, the only comfort given to Mick on a particularly hot summer's evening was a handkerchief soaked in cold water.

The re-run began, with Palatinus again getting away first, however at the first corner, Mick pursued him around the first corner alone. Catching him down the back straight, Mick pulled away around the third bend going on to beat him by three lengths in a time of 29.96. Although Palatinus completed the first run through, his time was one fifth of a second slower than that made by Mick in the second. When villagers in his home town of Killeigh heard of his success, an impromptu bonfire party was held.

After the Derby he went on to win the International at West Ham Stadium on 5 August and finished runner-up in the London Cup final on 26 November. He finished 1929 with a record of 26 wins from 32 races. He joined Wimbledon trainer Sidney Orton in December 1929 at the Burhill kennels in Hersham.

1930
He started 1930 well by finishing runner-up in the Champion Stakes at Wimbledon on 1 January and then won the Spring Cup at Wembley on 22 March. He then won the Derby again in front of 50,000 spectators including King Alfonso XIII of Spain. His victory there was his eleventh in succession. His run extended nineteen successive victories before he tore a shoulder muscle in a race at Wimbledon Stadium. During the run, he broke world records on four occasions and newspaper editors stopped using the headline of "Wonder Dog", instead replacing it with simply "Invincible". He finished the year winning 20 times from 23 races.

1931
A comeback was attempted in February 1931, again at Wimbledon, however Mick suffered a torn dewclaw in a trial, setting back his return until March when he won the Spring Cup again at Wembley breaking the track record in the final before he returned to White City with the aim of winning a third Derby.

Mick had still been favourite in that race, but for the first time in some 25 races, he was not odds on. Ryland R and Mick met again in the semi finals on 20 June, the second time in 48 races that Mick was not the favourite since coming over from Ireland. Coming out the first turn, Mick was fifth, but was bumped so wide that Ryland opened up a fifteen length lead over his at one point. However, Mick sped on, and overtook the other dogs until only Ryland remained. As they crossed the line, Ryland took the victory, but by only half a length. The Evening News stated that "Mick has never run a better race". However, this was the first time that Mick had ever lost three consecutive races, but at least qualified for the final.

The final took place on 27 June 1931, with 70,000 spectators attending to see Mick the Miller take on "The Black Express" Ryland R. The two dogs were both matched as joint favourites for the final at odds of 13–8. The other four dogs in the race were Golden Hammer, Mick's Fancy, Seldom Lad and Brunswick Bill. Just after 9pm, Ryland is out of the traps ahead of the others once again, with Mick in last position as they go around the first bend. Ryland led all the way until the final turn where Seldom Lad closed on him. The two dogs made contact and swung wide, the race steward spotted that Ryland had turned to snap at Seldom Lad and set off the no–race klaxon. The noise is drowned out by the crowd as Mick the Miller is suddenly coming through the pack. Despite being bumped earlier in the race, he found the inside rail and moved up past the others, beating Golden Hammer by a head at the line. The announcer repeats that it is a no race to the disappointment of the crowd. Ryland R was disqualified for "nosing and impeding" another dog. Phiddy Kempton, Mick's owner at the time, broke down into tears, "Mick has won! My darling Mick has won!" he cried. A re–run was ordered for 9:55pm, while the crowd began to get unruly. Kempton was refusing to allow Mick to compete in the re–run, adamant he had already run the Derby. The directors of the Greyhound Racing Association were in attendance, and knowing the effect that both the two favourites not running in the final of the Derby would mean for the sport, convinced Kempton to run Mick.

The race was re–run, and the tired Mick was never close to placing. He slipped at the first bend whilst attempting to take the inside. Seldom Lad overtook Golden Hammer and won the race unchallenged, with Mick finishing in fourth place. Mick's time in the voided race was 29.89 seconds, some two and a half lengths faster than Seldom Lad's time in the second. Mick lost a fourth race in a row for the first time ever, and the Derby trophy was awarded to Seldom Lad's owners amid a host of boos from the crowd.

The circumstances of the third derby changed the public perception of Mick. He was no longer simply a racing Greyhound, he had become a public icon and became the embodiment of the sport at an international level. The Greyhound Mirror and Gazette proclaimed of Mick, "Greyhound racing is still in its infancy, but already it has produced a popular favourite as idolised as any horse, cinema star, footballer or boxer in history." He was featured in articles around the world including Welt im Bild (Germany), the Herald Sun (Australia) and The American Weekly (USA). Mick continued to race for most of the rest of the year, with his final race being the St Leger Stakes in October at what was then called the Empire Stadium, winning the race whilst watched by 40,000 spectators. This race was later described as the greatest race ever staged at Wembley, which would go on to hold Greyhound racing until 1998 prior to its demolition to make room for the new Wembley Stadium. In qualifying for the final of that race, he beat Seldom Lad on three occasions. His retirement was announced in December 1931.

Later life
Mick spent the next two years at stud with Jack Masters at Mill Farm, near Dereham in Norfolk, and was the most expensive dog advertised at stud demanding 50 guineas. He was a special guest at the opening of Catford Stadium on 30 July 1932. He appeared with Flanagan and Allen in the 1934 movie Wild Boy. Although the Evening News predicted that it would be the "one of the most popular British films of the year", no box office records were kept and the only known copy is in the possession of the British Film Institute. It was reported as being badly received by critics and ran massively over budget.

Mick died on 6 May 1939, a few weeks short of his thirteenth birthday, having amassed around £20,000 in stud fees, from appearances in films, and in prize money. After his death he was stuffed and given by his last owner, A.H. Kempton, to the Natural History Museum in London; he has since been moved to the Natural History Museum at Tring in Hertfordshire. He stands in cabinet 58 of the household dogs section at the museum in an airtight case filled with an insecticide called Vapona in order to prevent any damage by insects.

Legacy
Mick the Miller is still credited as popularising Greyhound racing in Great Britain after his back to back English Greyhound Derby victories in 1929 and 1930. An enclosure was named after Mick at Wimbledon Stadium. Mick remained the only dog to win two Derby titles until 1973, when Patricias Hope won his second title. Royal Doulton produced a limited edition run of Mick the Miller figurines in the 1990s. A memorial to Mick was built on the village green of his birthplace in Killeigh, Co. Offaly. The statue was created by Northern Irish artist Liz O'Kane, and was unveiled by the Taoiseach of Ireland, Brian Cowen.

In 2007, journalist Jon Henderson drew up his list of 100 top British sportsman for his book Best of British: Hendo's Sporting Heroes. Mick the Miller was included in the list as the only Greyhound, with the only other animal being multi–time Grand National winner Red Rum. He is still referred to as the world's most famous Greyhound, having won 51 of the 68 races he was entered into and is the only dog to have won the treble of the Derby, Cesarewitch and St Leger.

Full race record
Mick The Miller ran a total of 81 races of which he won 61: 15 wins from 20 in Ireland and 46 wins from 61 in England.

Pedigree

See also
 Scurlogue Champ - another of the "great 3" racing greyhounds
 Ballyregan Bob - displayed alongside Mick the Miller
 List of individual dogs

Further reading

References

External links
 Mick The Miller Commemoration Committee
 Meet "Mick the Miller", 1931 British Pathé Film Reel

1926 animal births
1939 animal deaths
Greyhound racing in the United Kingdom
Individual animals in the United Kingdom
Racing greyhounds
Greyhound racing in Ireland